(stylized as A-FACTORY) is a market located in Aomori, Aomori Prefecture near Aomori Station. The market was opened in conjunction with the extension of the Tōhoku Shinkansen to Aomori on 4 December 2010.

It is managed by JRE-ABC, a subsidiary of the East Japan Railway Company.

Overview 
The market is located on the Aomori Bay waterfront of Aomori underneath the Aomori Bay Bridge. The market is within the vicinity of Aomori Station and the Nebuta House Wa Rasse.

The market serves as a place where specialty goods from around Aomori Prefecture can be sold in an easily accessible location to tourists visiting the prefecture's capital. The market also features various restaurants, listed below.

Notable products include apples and cider from around the prefecture, as well as an in-house cider that visitors can see being produced.

The market was the recipient of a Good Design Award in 2011.

Shops 
 1st Floor　Slow Food Marche
 Boulangerie Sevres（セブール）
 Arpajon Le Pommier（アルパジョン）
 Skip Egg
 Ocean's Burger
 Food Marchè
 2nd Floor　Third Place Lounge
 Galetteria Da Sasino

Surrounding area 
 Aomori Station
 Lovina
 AUGA
 Aomori Port
 Aomori Bay Bridge
 Aomori Prefecture Tourist Center
 Nebuta House Wa Rasse
 Seikan Connector Ferry Boat Memorial Ship “Hakkōda-maru”
 Aomori Prefectural Route 18 "Shinmachi"

References

External links 
 A-FACTORY Website
 

Buildings and structures completed in 2010
Tourist attractions in Aomori Prefecture
Aomori (city)
Drink companies of Japan